Chinababu is a 1988 Telugu-language drama film, produced by D. Ramanaidu under the Suresh Productions banner and directed by A. Mohan Gandhi. It stars Nagarjuna, Amala Akkineni and music composed by Chakravarthy. The film was dubbed in Tamil as Paasathai Thirudathe.

Cast

Nagarjuna as Venu Gopal
Amala Akkineni as Madhu
Rao Gopal Rao as Mukkamala Chakrapani
Mohan Babu as Sunnam Chinna Rao
Murali Mohan as Rama Rao
Nutan Prasad as Rayudu
Siva Krishna as Shivam
Subhalekha Sudhakar as Satyam
Chalapathi Rao 
Suthi Velu as Parvathalu
Brahmanandam as Panakaalu
Gundu Hanumantha Rao
Telephone Satyanarayana as I.G.
Tata Appa Rao as Minister
Dham
Rajya Lakshmi as Lakshmi
Malashri as Poorna
Kakinada Shyamala as Durgamma
Mamatha as Parvatamma
Chandrika as Jaya

Crew
Art: G. V. Subba Rao
Choreography: K. S. Raghuram
Fights: Vijayan
Story & Dialogues: Paruchuri Brothers
Lyrics: Veturi
Playback: S. P. Balasubrahmanyam, S. Janaki, P. Susheela, S. P. Sailaja
Editing: K. A. Marthand
Cinematography: P. S. Prakash
Music: Chakravarthy
Producer: D. Ramanaidu
Director: A. Mohana Gandhi
Banner: Suresh Productions 
Release Date: 6 May 1988

Soundtrack

The music was composed by Chakravarthy. Lyrics were written by Veturi and Bhuvana Chandra. Music released on AVM Audio Company.

References

External links

Films scored by K. Chakravarthy
Indian action drama films
1980s Telugu-language films
1980s action drama films
Suresh Productions films
Films directed by A. Mohan Gandhi